Adriana Elena Loreta Caselotti (May 6, 1916 – January 18, 1997) was an American actress and singer. Caselotti was the voice of the title character of the first Walt Disney animated feature, Snow White and the Seven Dwarfs, for which she was named a Disney Legend in 1994, making her the first female voice-over artist to achieve this.

Early life
Adriana Caselotti was born in Bridgeport, Connecticut, to an Italian-American family.  Her father, Guido Luigi Emanuele Caselotti, was an immigrant from Udine, and worked as a music teacher and vocal coach, and served as the organist for the Holy Rosary Church; and her mother, Maria Josephine  Caselotti from Casavatore, was a singer in the Royal Opera Theatre of Rome.  Her older sister, Louise, sang opera and gave voice lessons—Maria Callas being a student of hers.  When Caselotti was seven years old, her family left Connecticut for Italy, while her mother toured with an opera company.  Caselotti was educated and boarded at the San Getulio convent, near Rome.  When her family returned to New York three years later, Caselotti re-learned English and studied singing with her father.<ref name="NYT">"Adriana Caselotti, 80, Voice of Snow White"; New York Times;" Obituary article; 01/21/1997; retrieved October 8, 2017</ref>  In 1934, Caselotti attended Hollywood High School where she sang in the senior class Girls' Glee Club and had a leading role in the school's annual musical, The Belle of New York.

Career
In 1935, after her brief stint as a chorus girl and session singer at MGM, Walt Disney hired Caselotti as the voice of the heroine, Snow White.  She was paid a total of $970 for working on the film.  She was not credited for the role, and had trouble finding new opportunities later in life.  Jack Benny specifically mentioned that he had asked Walt Disney for permission to use her on his radio show and was told, "I'm sorry, but that voice can't be used anywhere. I don't want to spoil the illusion of Snow White." Caselotti had two more jobs in the film business. The first was an uncredited role in MGM's The Wizard of Oz (1939); she provided the voice of Juliet during the Tin Man's song, "If I Only Had a Heart", speaking the line, "Wherefore art thou Romeo?" In 1946, she had an uncredited role in Frank Capra's It's a Wonderful Life, singing in Martini's bar as James Stewart is praying.

Adriana Caselotti appeared in several promotional spots for Snow White and the Seven Dwarfs, and signed memorabilia during promotional events.  On November 22, 1972 (Thanksgiving Day), she guest-starred on an episode of The Julie Andrews Hour saluting the music of Walt Disney, singing "I'm Wishing" and "Some Day My Prince Will Come" with Julie Andrews. She also made a guest appearance on the syndicated The Mike Douglas Show.  Caselotti later wrote a how-to book, Do You Like to Sing?.

Later in life, she sold autographs and sang opera, including performing in Rigoletto''. In the early 1990s, when the Snow White Grotto at Disneyland was refurbished, Caselotti, at the age of 75, re-recorded "I'm Wishing" for the Snow White Wishing Well exhibit. In 1994, she was named a Disney Legend.

Personal life
Caselotti was married four times. Her first husband was Robert James Chard, a local theater ticket broker whom she married in 1945. The marriage ended in divorce. She later met actor Norval Weir Mitchell, whom she married in 1952. He retired after marrying her and died in 1972. The same year, she was married to a podiatrist, Joseph Dana Costigan, who died in 1982. Caselotti married her last husband, Joseph Laureat Florian St. Pierre, a retired postal employee, in 1989 and they later divorced.

Illness and death
On January 18, 1997, Caselotti died of cancer at her Los Angeles home, at the age of 80.

Filmography

Television

Television shows

Film

Radio

Awards and recognition

References

External links

 
 The magic behind the voices, 2004
 Salute Disney, 1972
 Caselotti performs songs from the film "Snow White and the Seven Dwarfs", 1937

1916 births
20th-century American actresses
American film actresses
1997 deaths
American voice actresses
Operatic sopranos
American women singers
American people of Italian descent
Deaths from lung cancer in California
Actresses from Bridgeport, Connecticut
American stage actresses
20th-century American women singers
20th-century American singers
American musical theatre actresses
American radio actresses
Disney Legends
20th-century American women opera singers